René Debrie (4 July 1920 – 1 August 1989) was a French linguist. He was born in Warloy-Baillon on 4 July 1920, and died in Amiens on 1 August 1989

Life
Debrie obtained his degree in literature in 1944 and his PhD at the Sorbonne in 1960.

He began his research career in 1950. From the 1960s to the 1980s, he became one of the experts of the dialect of the Picard language, greatly expanding knowledge in that area. He published numerous books and lexicons of dialectology. In 1975, he became an assistant professor in 1975 at the University of Picardy and was appointed a full professor in 1979.

He encouraged many of his students (including Beauvy Francois and Pierre Ivart) to publish lexicons and dictionaries of regional languages. He was the founder of the Centre d'études picardes (Center for Studies of the Picard Language) of the University of Picardy.

In 1966, he created the cultural association Éklitra with Pierre Garnier and Rene Vaillant.

Bibliography (selected)

 Le Verbe dans les parlers picards de l'Amiénois,  Éklitra, Amiens, 2001
 Toponymie d'Albert,  Eklitra, Amiens, 1996
 Comm'-y-serre Gueuvernon,  Eklitra, Amiens, 1989
 Lexique français-picard élaboré à partir des parlers de l'Amiénois, Bibliothèque municipale d'Amiens, 1989
 Le Secret des mots picards, recherches étymologiques,  Université de Picardie, Amiens, 1989
 La Fable dans la littérature picarde, illustrations de Vincent Gaudefroy, Centre d'études picardes, Université de Picardie, Amiens, 1988
 Répertoire de surnoms picards dans la Somme au XIXe,  Université de Picardie, Amiens, 1988
 Contribution à un corpus des noms de marques, Centre d'études de la langue des affaires, Amiens 1987
 Hydronymie de la Somme,  Université de Picardie, Amiens, 1987
 Bibliographie d'ethnologie picarde,  Université de Picardie, Amiens, 1985
 Glossaire du moyen picard,  Université de Picardie, Amiens, 1984
 Bibliographie de dialectologie picarde,  Université de Picardie, Amiens, 1982
 Jacques Croédur : héros légendaire abbevillois,  C.R.D.P., Amiens, 1980
 Un auteur picard mal connu, Joseph Crinon : 1877-1956,  Archives départementales de la Somme, Amiens, 1979
 Pratiques agricoles ancestrales dans le pays de Somme : étude dialecto-folklorique,  C.R.D.P., Amiens, 1978
 Édouard Paris, un érudit picard émérite (avec Michel Crampon),  C.R.D.P., Amiens, 1977
 Un poème gothique : la Romance du sire de Créqui, une énigme littéraire picarde (avec Pierre Garnier),  C.R.D.P., Amiens, 1976
 Répertoire des noms de famille de la Somme en 1849, avec René Boyenval et René Vaillant,  Éklitra, Amiens, 1972
 Hector Crinon : étude littéraire et lexique de sa langue (avec Pierre Garnier),  Éklitra, Amiens, 1970
 Recherches sur les noms de plantes et les noms d'insectes dans les parlers de la région d'Amiens, C.R.D.P., Amiens, 1969
 Corpus des lieux-dits cadastraux de la Somme, C.R.D.P., Amiens, 1964
 Dictionnaire des noms de famille d'Albert, 1178-1952, Archives du Pas-de-Calais, Arras, 1960
Parmi ses très nombreux lexiques, citons :
 Lexique picard des parlers nord-amiénois, Sté de dialectologie picarde, 1961, 198 p. et supplément de 96 p, Arras, 1965.
 Lexique picard des parlers ouest-amiénois, Centre d'études picardes, Amiens, 1975, 424 p.
 Lexique picard des parlers sud-amiénois, Éklitra, Amiens, 1979, 252 p.
 Lexique picard des parlers est-amiénois, Centre d'études picardes, Amiens, 1983, 153 p.

Works in collaboration 
René Debrie collaborated on several books, including: 
 La Picardie,  Ed. d'Organisation, Paris, (1981)
 La Forêt Invisible. Au nord de la littérature française, le picard, anthologie de la littérature d’expression picarde, Jacques Darras (dir), René Debrie, Pierre Ivart, éd. des Trois-Cailloux, Amiens,   (1985)
 Bibliographie des Dictionnaires patois de Wartburg, Keller et Geuljans (partly on the Picard language) (1969)

References 

Work on Rene Debrie:
 Source picarde - Hommage à René Debrie,  Centre d'études picardes, Amiens, 234 p. (1992)

1920 births
1989 deaths
Linguists from France
20th-century linguists
Picard language
University of Paris alumni